The list of ship launches in 1717 includes a chronological list of some ships launched in 1717.


References

1717
Ship launches